The National Counties Cricket Association Knockout Cup was started in 1983 as a knockout one-day competition for the National Counties in English cricket. At first it was known as the English Industrial Estates Cup, before being called the Minor Counties Knock Out Competition from 1986 to 1987, the Holt Cup from 1988 to 1992, the MCC Trophy from 1993 to 1998, the ECB 38-County Cup from 1999 to 2002, the MCCA Knockout Trophy from 2003 to 2005. It has been called the MCCA Trophy since 2006 until its current rebranding in 2020.

From 1998 to 2002, the competition was contested by 38 teams and included a group stage. The traditional National counties, plus Huntingdonshire and the "cricket boards" of the 18 first-class counties, as well as a Channel Islands team. The 2002 competition, which was won by the Warwickshire Cricket Board, remains the only time a non-National county has won the competition. This format was discontinued after 2002 and the competition is again a purely National counties affair.

The most successful county is Berkshire who have won the title seven times. They are also the current champions having won the last three editions of the competition, defeating Cumbria in the last two finals.

List of winners

Wins by county
 7 wins: Berkshire
 5 wins: Devon, Norfolk
 4 wins: Cheshire
 2 wins: Staffordshire, Cambridgeshire, Cumberland, Herefordshire
 1 win: Hertfordshire, Durham, Dorset, Buckinghamshire, Bedfordshire, Warwickshire Cricket Board, Northumberland, Suffolk, Shropshire, Cornwall

See also
National Counties Cricket Championship
Friends Provident Trophy – the now defunct one-day tournament for first-class counties, which the Minor counties were once permitted to take part in

References

External links
National Counties Cricket Association Official Site

English domestic cricket competitions